Marvel vs. DC may refer to:
DC vs. Marvel, a comic book series featuring the characters of both DC and Marvel
Marvel vs. DC Cards, trading cards